Eliezer Joldan Memorial College Leh, Ladakh (also known as Govt. Degree College, Leh) is the government general degree college in Leh, in the union territory of Ladakh, India. It offers undergraduate courses in science, commerce and arts.

About college
The college was established in 1994 and affiliated to the University of Ladakh. The college is named after Ladakhi educator Eliezer Joldan.

In the present running session 2018-19, there are 940 students studying in the college with 229 boys and 711 girls. Like in all other affiliated colleges of University of Ladakh, the semester system is followed.

See also

References

External links 
 University of Ladakh

University of Ladakh
Leh
Educational institutions established in 1994
1994 establishments in Jammu and Kashmir
Education in Ladakh
Colleges affiliated to University of Ladakh